Markus Eisenbichler (born 3 April 1991) is a German ski jumper, current World Champion in team champion, team mixed competition and former World Champion on the large hill.

Career
His FIS Ski Jumping World Cup debut took place in December 2011 at the Four Hills Tournament in Oberstdorf. On 23 February 2019, Eisenbichler became the individual world champion on large hill in Seefeld in Tirol. Later he won another two gold World Championship medals in the team event and mixed team event. On 22 March 2019, he achieved his long-awaited first World Cup win during the Ski Flying event in Planica. Also, in Planica on 12 December 2020, he won the bronze medal of the 2020 Ski Flying World Championships.

Record

Olympic Games

World Championships

FIS Ski Flying World Championships

World Cup

Season standings

Individual wins

Team victories

Individual starts

Podiums

Ski jumping national record

References

External links

1991 births
Living people
German male ski jumpers
FIS Nordic World Ski Championships medalists in ski jumping
Olympic ski jumpers of Germany
Ski jumpers at the 2018 Winter Olympics
Ski jumpers at the 2022 Winter Olympics
Olympic bronze medalists for Germany
Olympic medalists in ski jumping
Medalists at the 2022 Winter Olympics
People from Traunstein (district)
Sportspeople from Upper Bavaria